Morrie's law is a special trigonometric identity. Its name is due to the physicist Richard Feynman, who used to refer to the identity under that name. Feynman picked that name because he learned it during his childhood from a boy with the name Morrie Jacobs and afterwards remembered it for all of his life.

Identity and generalisation

It is a special case of the more general identity

with n = 3 and α = 20° and the fact that 

since

Similar identities 
A similar identity for the sine function also holds:

Moreover, dividing the second identity by the first, the following identity is evident:

Proof

Geometric proof of Morrie's law 

Applying the cosinus definition in the right angle triangles ,  and  then yields the proof for Morrie's law:

Algebraic proof of the generalised identity 
Recall the double angle formula for the sine function

Solve for 

It follows that:

Multiplying all of these expressions together yields:

The intermediate numerators and denominators cancel leaving only the first denominator, a power of 2 and the final numerator. Note that there are n terms in both sides of the expression. Thus,

which is equivalent to the generalization of Morrie's law.

References

Further reading 
 Glen Van Brummelen: Trigonometry: A Very Short Introduction. Oxford University Press, 2020, pp. 79–83
 Ernest C. Anderson: Morrie's Law and Experimental Mathematics. In:  Journal of recreational mathematics, 1998

External links
 

Mathematical identities
Trigonometry
Articles containing proofs